This is a list representing time zones by country. Countries are ranked by total number of time zones on their territory. Time zones of a country include that of dependent territories (except Antarctic claims). France, including its overseas territories, has the most time zones with 12 (13 including its claim in Antarctica). Many countries have daylight saving time, one added hour during the local summer, but this list does not include that information. The UTC offset in the list is not valid in practice during daylight saving time.

See also
Time zone
Lists of time zones
List of UTC time offsets
Time zone abolition

References

Time zones
Time zones
 

Time zones